Annik Kälin (born 27 April 2000) is a Swiss athlete who competes in the heptathlon and pentathlon.

References

Swiss pentathletes
2000 births
Swiss heptathletes
Living people
Place of birth missing (living people)
21st-century Swiss women
European Athletics Championships medalists